6 Cheyne Walk is a Grade II* listed house on Cheyne Walk, Chelsea, London, built in 1718.

Owned by Crown Prince Pavlos and Crown Princess Marie Chantal of Greece.

See also
 4 Cheyne Walk

References

 Godfrey, Walter H. "Cheyne Walk: No. 6." Survey of London: Volume 2, Chelsea, Pt I. London: London County Council, 1909. 45-49. British History Online..Web. 6 May 2022.
Buildings and structures on the River Thames
Grade II* listed buildings in the Royal Borough of Kensington and Chelsea
Grade II* listed houses in London
Houses completed in 1718
Houses in the Royal Borough of Kensington and Chelsea
Chelsea, London
1718 establishments in England